Baby Ruth is an American candy bar made of peanuts, caramel, and milk chocolate-flavored nougat, covered in compound chocolate. It is distributed by the Ferrara Candy Company, a subsidiary of Ferrero.

History 
In 1920, the Curtiss Candy Company refashioned its Kandy Kake into the Baby Ruth, and it became the best-selling confection in the five-cent confectionery category by the late 1920s. The bar was a staple of the Chicago-based company for more than six decades.

Curtiss was purchased by Nabisco in 1981. In 1990, RJR Nabisco sold the Curtiss brands to Nestlé. Ferrero acquired Nestlé USA's confectionery brands, including Baby Ruth, in 2018. Ferrero folded production of the acquired brands into the Ferrara Candy Company.

Ferrara relaunched Baby Ruth in December 2019. The new recipe includes dry-roasted peanuts grown in the United States, whereas previous versions contained peanuts roasted in oil. It also removed the food preservative TBHQ.

Etymology

Although the name of the candy bar sounds like the name of the famous baseball player Babe Ruth, the Curtiss Candy Company traditionally claimed that it was named after President Grover Cleveland's daughter, Ruth Cleveland. The candy maker, located on the same street as Wrigley Field, named the bar "Baby Ruth" in 1921, as Babe Ruth's fame was on the rise, 24 years after Cleveland had left the White House, and 17 years after his daughter, Ruth, had died. The company did not negotiate an endorsement deal with Ruth, and many saw the company's story about the origin of the name to be a devious way to avoid having to pay the baseball player any royalties. In a patent appeal, Curtiss successfully shut down a rival bar that was approved by, and named for, Ruth, on the grounds that the names were too similar.

In the trivia book series Imponderables, David Feldman reports the standard story about the bar being named for Grover Cleveland's daughter, with additional information that ties it to the President: "The trademark was patterned exactly after the engraved lettering of the name used on a medallion struck for the Chicago World's Columbian Exposition in 1893 and picturing the President, his wife, and daughter Baby Ruth." However, this may have been an after-the-fact covering maneuver. He also cites More Misinformation, by Tom Burnam: "Burnam concluded that the candy bar was named ... after the granddaughter of Mr. and Mrs. George Williamson, candy makers who developed the original formula and sold it to Curtiss." (Williamson had also sold the "Oh Henry!" formula to Curtiss around that time.) The write-up goes on to note that marketing the product as being named for a company executive's granddaughter would likely have been less successful, hence their "official" story.

However, David Mikkelson of Snopes.com denies the claim that the Williamsons invented the recipe, as George Williamson was head of the Williamson Candy Company, producers of the Oh Henry! bar. He continues to say that "the Baby Ruth bar came about when Otto Schnering, founder of the Curtiss Candy Company, made some alterations to his company's first candy offering, a confection known as 'Kandy Kake.

Marketing

To promote the candy, company founder Otto Schnering chartered a plane in 1923 to drop thousands of Baby Ruth bars, each with its own miniature parachute, over the city of Pittsburgh. Thereafter, Schnering performed the parachute drops in various cities in over forty states.

In 1929, the Curtiss Candy Company sponsored The Baby Ruth Hour, a CBS Radio program.

As if to tweak their own official denial of the name's origin, after Babe Ruth's "called shot" at Wrigley Field in the 1932 World Series, Curtiss installed an illuminated advertising sign for Baby Ruth on the roof of one of the flats across Sheffield Avenue, near where Ruth's home run ball had landed in center field. The sign stood for some four decades before being removed.

In 1985, Nabisco paid $100,000 for the product placement of Baby Ruth to appear in the film The Goonies.

In 1992, the company sponsored Bill Davis Racing's NASCAR Busch Grand National Series #1 Ford for future NASCAR superstar Jeff Gordon. The following year, the sponsorship moved to Jeff Burton's #8 Ford.

In 1995, a company representing the Ruth estate licensed his name and likeness for use in a Baby Ruth marketing campaign.

On p. 34 of the spring 2007 edition of the Chicago Cubs game program, there is a full-page ad showing a partially unwrapped Baby Ruth in front of the Wrigley ivy, with the caption, "The official candy bar of major league baseball, and proud sponsor of the Chicago Cubs."

Continuing the baseball-oriented theme, during the summer and post-season of the 2007 season, a TV ad for the candy bar showed an entire stadium (identified as Dodger Stadium) filled with people munching Baby Ruths, and thus having to hum rather than singing along with "Take Me Out to the Ball Game" during the seventh-inning stretch.

Ingredients

The original flavor U.S. edition, listed by weight in decreasing order, contains sugar, roasted peanuts, corn syrup, partially hydrogenated palm kernel and coconut oil, nonfat milk, cocoa, high-fructose corn syrup and less than 1% of glycerin, whey (from milk), dextrose, salt, egg, monoglyceride, soy lecithin, soybean oil, natural and artificial flavors, carrageenan, TBHQ, citric acid (to preserve freshness) and caramel color.

Sizes

Related products
Nestlé produces a Baby Ruth ice cream bar with a milk chocolate coating, chocolate-covered peanuts, and a vanilla-and-nougat flavored ice cream center. Nestlé also produces Baby Ruth Crisp bars, which are chocolate-covered wafer cookies, with a caramel-flavored cream and crushed peanuts. This is part of a line of Nestlé products under the Crisp name, including Nestlé Crunch Crisp and Butterfinger Crisp.

In popular culture
The Baby Ruth bar is infamously featured in a scene in the 1980 movie Caddyshack that takes place at a pool party. Two teenage girls are sitting at poolside and one offers to share the tasty confection  with her friend, when a third teen — a boy — asks for a piece of the candy and the young ladies refuse his request. The boy then tries to take the candy from the first girl. The second girl snatches the candy bar out of the first girl's hand and tosses it into the pool, the first girl looks at it floating, and says “Hey!, Thanks a lot!”, her friend just shrugs it off with a laugh. As theme music reminiscent of Jaws plays the candy floats in the crowded pool, until a little girl spies it and screams “Doodie!” Chaos ensues as the swimmers all rush to get out of the pool, until only Spaulding remains, due to using a mask and snorkel. He swims right up to it, screams “Doodie!” and swims away. Mrs Smails, watching the scene unfurl, faints. When Carl Spackler (Bill Murray) is cleaning out the pool afterward and recognizes the offending item as a Baby Ruth bar ("It's no big deal!"), he takes a bite out of it, much to the disgust of the country club's co-founder, Judge Smails and his wife (played by Ted Knight and Lois Kibbee), who still believe it to be fecal matter.

Baby Ruth was used in the American film The Goonies by Chunk to befriend Sloth.

In the film The Sandlot, Scotty Smalls (after using his stepfather's Babe Ruth-autographed baseball in a game and wanting to get it back after he hit it over the fence into a backyard) mistakenly tells his friends that it was autographed by "Baby Ruth"; his friends knew what he meant to say and shout "BABE RUTH!" before running to the fence to see the ball before it is taken away by a demonic dog that they call "the Beast".

In the Ghostbusters novelization by Richard Mueller, Egon Spengler frequently is said to be eating Baby Ruth candy bars.

In a 1960 episode of Leave It to Beaver, Beaver and his friends lose an old autographed baseball belonging to Beaver's father. They find another ball and try to fake the signatures. One they add is "Baby Ruth".

In the film The Mighty both Max and Kevin are awarded Baby Ruth bars for taking care of a problem in a local store.

In the film Hellboy, a Baby Ruth bar is used to lure and  mollify the infant Hellboy when he is discovered after the destruction of the Nazi portal.

A popular song from the year 1956 was "A Rose and a Baby Ruth," written by John D. Loudermilk and recorded by George Hamilton IV.

In the movie Four Brothers, Angel Mercer (played by Tyrese Gibson) offers to give a local kid playing baseball an entire box of Baby Ruth bars if he helps Angel by creating a distraction so Angel can ambush a dirty cop at his home.

In the television series Friends, Rachel Green (played by Jennifer Aniston) and Ross Geller (played by David Schwimmer) are discussing baby names, almost settling on the name Ruth until Rachel excitedly says "Yes! We're having a little baby Ruth..." and they realise the obvious brand recognition joke.

In a 2002 episode of The Simpsons called "The Great Louse Detective", Bart Simpson pranks people at a luxury spa by floating a Baby Ruth down a mineral bath.

It appears in the Family Guy episode "Hell Comes to Quahog" when Meg feeds Sloth from the 1985 film The Goonies.

In the Taxi episode "Louie and the Nice Girl", Louie De Palma (Danny DeVito) brags about getting the first Baby Ruth out of the vending machine after Zena (Rhea Pearlman) restocks it.

See also
 List of chocolate bar brands

References

Further reading

External links

 Baby Ruth website

Brand name confectionery
Chocolate bars
Ice cream brands
Ferrero SpA brands
Products introduced in 1921
Peanut dishes
Cultural depictions of Babe Ruth